Panzer Campaigns: Smolensk '41 is video game released in 1999, and is part of the Panzer Campaigns video game series.

Gameplay
The game covers the First Battle of Smolensk at battalion level. The full campaign map represents an area of 200x300 km (125x186 mi), divided in hexes measuring 1 km (1.6 mi). A turn represents two hours of daytime, or four hours of night. The hex size and turn length were generally maintained in the subsequent games.

Reception

StrategyPage, a publication whose chief editor is Jim Dunnigan, the author of the 1976 board wargame Panzergruppe Guderian, on which the computer game is loosely based, also reviewed the computer game, and gave Smolensk '41 three different ratings, depending on the audience: two stars for the general gaming public due to excessive complexity (but noting that HPS Simulations did not market the game to this public), "four plus" stars for the grognard that enjoys fine-grained control over battalion-level units in a game of this scale, but reducing this score for the user interested in more realistic command structures to four stars for the small scenarios, and just three for the grand campaign. The Wargamer review appreciated the scale of the game, and its interface, which brought HPS games on par with those from its TalonSoft competitor Campaign series.

The editors of Computer Games Strategy Plus named Smolensk '41 the best wargame of 1999, and called it a solid and playable game for wargamers.

References

1999 video games
Android (operating system) games
Computer wargames
Eastern Front (World War II)
Turn-based strategy video games
Video games about Nazi Germany
Video games developed in the United States
Video games set in Russia
Video games set in the Soviet Union
Windows games
World War II video games